Professor D. Gareth R. Evans  (born May 1959) is a British medical geneticist.

Evans trained at St Mary's Hospital Medical School, specialising in paediatrics in the Army. He then switched to genetics at Saint Mary's Hospital, Manchester.

He served as Medical Officer to the Royal Hussars as an RAMC officer between 1984–1986.

From 1990 to 1992 he undertook an MD in cancer genetics  developing his career specialisation in neurofibromatosis type 2, while working as a Senior Clinical Research Fellow at Manchester University, later becoming an Honorary Professor of Medical Genetics there, and a Consultant in Medical Genetics and Cancer Epidemiology with the Central Manchester University Hospitals NHS Foundation Trust and The Christie NHS Foundation Trust.

He served as chair of the National Institute of Clinical Excellence's Familial Breast Cancer Guideline Development Group from 2002 to 2010, becoming its clinical lead in 2011. He also served as Chief Investigator for a National Institute for Health Research–funded project on breast cancer prediction from 2009. He is a two term NIHR Senior investigator.

He was co-editor of Risk Assessment and Management in Cancer Genetics.

Works

References 

He has published over 820 articles and book chapters

External links 

 
 

1959 births
Place of birth missing (living people)
Living people
20th-century British medical doctors
21st-century British medical doctors
British medical researchers
British geneticists
Fellows of the Royal College of Physicians
Royal Hussars officers
NIHR Senior Investigators